Megastomia troncosoi is a species of sea snail, a marine gastropod mollusk in the family Pyramidellidae, the pyrams and their allies.

Distribution
This species occurs in the Atlantic Ocean off Guinea-Bissau.

References

External links
 To Encyclopedia of Life

Pyramidellidae
Gastropods described in 2002
Invertebrates of West Africa